Copper-clad aluminium wire (CCAW or CCA) is a dual metal electrical conductor composed of an inner aluminium core and outer copper cladding.

Uses
The primary applications of this conductor revolve around weight reduction requirements.  These applications include high-quality coils, such as the voice coils in headphones or portable loudspeakers; high frequency coaxial applications, such as RF antennas and cable television distribution cables; and power cables.

CCA was also used in electrical wiring for buildings. The copper/aluminium construction was adopted to avoid some of the problems with aluminium wire, yet retain most of the cost advantage.

CCA is also seen in counterfeit unshielded twisted pair networking cables. These cables are often less expensive than their full-copper counterparts,  but 
the official specifications such as Category 6 cable require conductors to be pure copper. This has exposed the manufacturers or installers of cable with fake certification to legal liabilities.

Properties
The properties of copper-clad aluminium wire include:
 Less expensive than a pure copper wire
 Lighter than pure copper
 Higher electrical conductivity than pure aluminium
 Higher strength than aluminium
 Electrical connections are typically more reliable than pure aluminium
 Typically produced as a 10% or 15% by copper volume product

Skin effect
The skin effect forces alternating current to flow on the outer periphery of any wire; in this case, the outer copper cladding of the conductor which has lower resistance than the mostly unused aluminum interior. The better conductor on the outer path causes the wire's resistance at high frequencies, where the skin effect is greater, to approach that of a pure copper wire. This improved conductivity over bare aluminum makes the copper-clad aluminium wire a good fit for radio frequency use.

The skin effect is similarly exploited in copper-clad steel wire, such as the center conductors of many coaxial cables, which are commonly used for high frequency feedlines with high strength and conductivity requirements.

See also
 Copper conductor

References

Electrical wiring
Power cables
Aluminium
Copper